PSRD may stand for:

 Pakistan Society for the Rehabilitation of the Disabled,  non-profit, charitable organization based in lahore, Pakistan
 Port Scandalous Roller Derby, sports league based in Port Angeles, Washington
 Press Scrutiny and Registration Division, Burmese censorship organisation